NNPI is an acronym for:
 Novo Nordisk Pharmaceuticals, Incorporated
 Naval Nuclear Propulsion Information
 nonnegotiated premodified input, in acquisition of English as a second language, input that is modified and adjusted to the level of learners